Liselotte Hopfer is a German luger who competed during the mid-1930s. She won a silver medal in the women's singles event at the 1935 European luge championships in Krynica, Poland.

References
List of European luge champions 

German female lugers
Year of birth missing
Year of death missing